Woodcrest Christian High School is a private Christian high school located in Riverside, California, United States, in the census-designated place of Woodcrest.  It is part of the Woodcrest Christian School System, which includes the Woodcrest Christian Middle School, and the Woodcrest Christian Day School. The system was founded in 1948 with Riverside Christian Day School (TK-6) by Matilda Randall, now called Woodcrest Christian Day School, and expanded with the Woodcrest campus (7-12) in 1973. Woodcrest Christian High School's school colors are purple and gold.

In Feb. 2013, the school named James Sullivan as superintendent.

As of 2017, annual tuition is (USD) $9,280.

Notable alumni
 Odette Annable, actress
 Jason Martin, musician
 Trevor Oaks, professional baseball player for the San Francisco Giants
 Aaron Chandler, professional soccer player

References

External links
 WCHS home page
 

Christian schools in California
High schools in Riverside, California
Private high schools in California